The  Film Censorship  Board of Malaysia (Malay: Lembaga Penapis Filem) is a Malaysian government ministry that vets films. It is under the control of the Ministry of Home Affairs.

History and legislative regulations
LPF was established on 1 May 1954 in Singapore. Later, the Malaysian Film Censorship Board was established in 1966 to implement policies and censorship system for the whole of Malaysia, including Sabah and Sarawak. The Film Censorship Act 2002 is the act that is effective today. Any film that is to be screened in Malaysia must be certified by the Board. Under the provisions of the Act, no one is allowed to view any film that has not been licensed by the Board.

The same Act also bans the possession and/or screening of pornography or provocative materials. Films that contain sex and nude scenes are strictly censored/prohibited. Screening of such films in public even in good faith can subject the screener to fines/imprisonment.

The Board watches the uncensored film or programme and decides whether its content is acceptable for a Malaysian audience. The film receives approval only after the Board is satisfied that the film (either without cuts or with cuts required by the Board) satisfies the rules under which the Board operates. 

Any film passed with compulsory cuts must have the cuts made by the distributor before the film is released/screened. This is accomplished either by having the studio produce an edited version (in the case of digital or television screenings) or by physically removing (cutting out) the offending section on the film itself. Screening films with compulsory cuts in its unedited form can make the distributor and cinema operator or television station operator legally liable.

Rating system

From April 2012 till January 2023, the film censorship board announced only 3 film classifications. 
Beginning February 2023, two new film classifications have been added and these are following ratings that currently being authorised by the Board:

See also
 Film censorship in Malaysia

References

External links 
 
 Sinema Malaysia: "Editorial interview with Tuan Hj Husain Hj Shafie, Chairman Malaysia's Film Censorship Board"

Federal ministries, departments and agencies of Malaysia
Film censorship in Malaysia
1954 establishments in Malaya
Government agencies established in 1954
Ministry of Home Affairs (Malaysia)